This is the complete list of Olympic medalists in lacrosse from 1904 to 1908.

Sources

1904

1908

 

Lacrosse
Olympic medalists in lacrosse
Olympic